Mariza Mariana Gregorio (born 7 August 1976) is a Mozambican former swimmer. She competed in the women's 100 metre butterfly event at the 1992 Summer Olympics.

References

External links
 

1976 births
Living people
Mozambican female butterfly swimmers
Olympic swimmers of Mozambique
Swimmers at the 1992 Summer Olympics
Place of birth missing (living people)